Azermarka is the Azerbaijani state company responsible for the production and sale of Azerbaijani postage stamps. It is not to be confused with the Azerbaijan Post Office, Azerpost, which is a separate organisation.

Since 1992 a variety of definitive and commemorative stamps have been produced depicting topical and local subjects. First day covers and postal stationery have also been issued.

See also 
 Azərpoçt, the national postal service of Azerbaijan
 Postage stamps and postal history of Azerbaijan

References

External links 
 Official website. 
 Postal directory entry. 

Postal organizations
Postal system of Azerbaijan
Government agencies established in 1991
Philately of Azerbaijan
1991 establishments in Azerbaijan